Record is an English surname. Notable people with this surname include:

 Eugene Record (1940–2005), American soul singer, original member of The Chi-Lites
 Samuel J. Record (1881–1945), American botanist

See also
 Reckord

English-language surnames